Buddhist Global Relief is an organization of socially engaged Buddhists with a mission to "combat chronic hunger and malnutrition" founded by Bhikkhu Bodhi.

History

When the 2004 Indian Ocean earthquake and tsunami happened, Bhikkhu Bodhi was moved to action. He soon raised $160,000 with many dharma friends and when looking for charitable relief organizations he was dismayed to discover a dearth of Buddhist organizations. Three years later, Bodhi authored an article in Buddhadharma: The Practitioner's Quarterly entitled "A Challenge to Buddhists" which urged American Buddhists to be more socially engaged.

Inspired by the article, Bodhi with some of his students formally established Buddhist Global Relief in June 2008 and had it registered the corporation in New Jersey.

Programs

BGR works to create long term solutions for ending poverty and hunger as well as focusing on women's education and economic power worldwide.

BGR has partnered with Helen Keller International to provide sufficient micronutrients to people in Niger and Mali. Since 2009, BGR has partnered with Lotus Outreach to create "Food Scholarships for Girls to Stay in School" in Cambodia. BGR was one of the 40 groups which pledged to work with "Tomorrow Together", a coalition created to promote a five-year initiative to encourage unity, empathy, and service each year on 9/11, through to the 20th anniversary of 9/11 in 2021.

After the April 2015 Nepal earthquake, BGR made an emergency donation of $10,000 which was distributed among five charities: UNICEF, CARE, Direct Relief, Oxfam America, and the International Medical Corps.

BGR was one of many organizations which has attempted to aid Syrian Refugees. As of December 2015, they donated $12,000 to be split among 6 charitable causes.

To raise funds for their programs, BGR holds annual "Walks to Feed the Hungry" which take place in cities across the United States.

References

External links
Buddhist Global Relief
BGR Blog

Buddhism in the United States
Buddhist organizations based in the United States
Organizations established in 2008